The Gres a Avicula contorta is a geological formation in France. It dates back to the late Norian.

Vertebrate paleofauna
Rhomphaiodon nicolensis (type locality)

See also
 List of dinosaur-bearing rock formations

References

Triassic System of Europe
Norian Stage